Pulupandan, officially the Municipality of Pulupandan,  is a 3rd class municipality in the province of Negros Occidental, Philippines. According to the 2020 census, it has a population of 30,117 people.

With an area of 23 square kilometers, it is the smallest town in terms of area in Negros Occidental.

The town was once a barrio of Valladolid before it became a separate municipality in 1917. It was in the beaches of Pulupandan in the early dawn of March 29, 1945 that the historical event of the landing of American liberation forces without any opposition, who together with the Filipino guerillas, drive the Japanese forces away from the island of Negros during the Battle of the Visayas.

The town is also known for their annual "Salapan Festival".

Etymology 
The town's name is derived from the vernacular phrase Pulo sang Pandan, meaning the "Isle of Pandan".

Geography

Barangays
Pulupandan is politically subdivided into 20 barangays

Climate

Demographics

Economy

Politics
The current mayor of Pulupandan is Miguel C. Peña, son of its former mayor Magdaleno "Magsie" Peña who, until recently, was mayor of Moises Padilla town.

Known for being a bailiwick of the Liberal Party, the town is notable for being the only municipality in Negros Occidental where Rodrigo Duterte won during the 2016 presidential election.

Transportation
Pulupandan currently has a sea port with RORO vessels traveling straight to the island province of Guimaras.

Notable personalities

 Lea Salonga, singer-actress

References

External links
 [ Philippine Standard Geographic Code]
Philippine Census Information
Local Governance Performance Management System

Municipalities of Negros Occidental